HLN may refer to:
 Harlington railway station (station code), in England
 HLN (TV network), an American television news network
 Helena Regional Airport (IATA airport code), in Montana, United States
 Het Laatste Nieuws ("The Latest News"), a Belgian Dutch-language newspaper
 Hikami-Larkin-Nagaoka equation, describing weak localization in low-temperature physics
 Horizon League Network,  a collegiate athletic conference in the Midwestern United States
 Phenolphthalein, a chemical indicator, abbreviated "Hln"